Salmond government can refer to
First Salmond government, the Scottish Executive led by Alex Salmond from 2007 to 2011
Second Salmond government, the Scottish Government led by Alex Salmond from 2011 to 2014